Weisler is a surname. Notable people with the surname include:

Bob Wiesler (1930–2014), American baseball player 
Dion Weisler (born 1967), Australian-born businessman living in the United States

See also
Weiser (disambiguation)
Weisser